The Commonwealth of Virginia is divided into 95 counties and 38 independent cities, which are considered county-equivalents for census purposes. All counties, with the exception of Arlington County, are further subdivided into magisterial districts. Magisterial districts are defined by the United States Census Bureau as a minor civil division that is a nonfunctioning subdivision used in conducting elections or recording land ownership, and are not governments. These districts are unique to counties only and do not exist in Virginia's 38 independent cities. The only other state to use magisterial districts outside Virginia is West Virginia.

List of the 458 magisterial districts in the Commonwealth of Virginia:



Accomack County

Albemarle County

Alleghany County

Amelia County

Amherst County

Appomattox County

Augusta County

Bath County

Bedford County

Bland County

Botetourt County

Brunswick County

Buchanan County

Buckingham County

Campbell County

Caroline County

Carroll County

Charles City County

Charlotte County

Chesterfield County

Clarke County

Craig County

Culpeper County

Cumberland County

Dickenson County

Dinwiddie County

Fairfax County

Fauquier County

Floyd County

Fluvanna County

Franklin County

Frederick County

Giles County

Gloucester County

Goochland County

Grayson County

Greene County

Greensville County

Halifax County

Hanover County

Henrico County

Henry County

Highland County

Isle of Wight County

James City County

King and Queen County

King George County

King William County

Lancaster County

Lee County

Loudoun County

Louisa County

Lunenburg County

Madison County

Mathews County

Mecklenburg County

Middlesex County

Montgomery County

Nelson County

New Kent County

Northampton County

Northumberland County

Nottoway County

Orange County

Page County

Patrick County

Pittsylvania County

Powhatan County

Prince Edward County

Prince George County

Prince William County

Pulaski County

Rappahannock County

Richmond County

Roanoke County

Rockbridge County

Rockingham County

Russell County

Scott County

Shenandoah County

Smyth County

Southampton County

Spotsylvania County

Stafford County

Surry County

Sussex County

Tazewell County

Warren County

Washington County

Westmoreland County

Wise County

Wythe County

York County

References
Virginia American Indian Areas, Counties, Independent Cities, County Subdivisions, and Other Places from the Census Bureau's State/County Subdivision Outline Maps (PDF)

Magisterial districts
Magisterial districts